Torigoe is a Japanese surname. Notable people with the surname include:

, Japanese women's footballer
, Japanese journalist and activist
, Japanese baseball player

See also
Torigoe, Ishikawa, a former village in Ishikawa District, Ishikawa Prefecture, Japan

Japanese-language surnames